Carolyn Sapp Daniels (born Carolyn Suzanne Sapp on April 5, 1967) is an actress, singer, stuntwoman, and motivational speaker best known as the first representative from Hawaii to win Miss America in 1992.

Early life
Sapp was born in Kona to Susan and Fred Sapp, a dance teacher and Lutheran minister, respectively. Her parents divorced amicably when she was an infant. Sapp was raised by her step-grandparents and attended Columbia River Bible Church and Academy in Washington state from kindergarten to 12th grade.

Pageantry

Miss Hawaii
After graduating high school she financed her college education at Hawaii Pacific University by winning several pageants including Miss Kona Coffee and Miss Hawaii Pacific University. Sapp competed in Miss Hawaii three times before winning in 1991, enabling her to represent her state at the Miss America 1992 pageant.

Miss America 1992
During the preliminary competition, Sapp won the preliminary swimsuit round and was crowned the winner of the pageant on the final night of competition becoming the first Miss America titleholder outside of the contiguous United States.

A day after her coronation, it was revealed that Sapp had been in an abusive relationship with former New York Jets player Nuu Faaola whom she had dated before her Miss Hawaii tenure, and later stated that this leaked information was against her wishes as it was a personal matter. Although she had chosen education as her Miss America platform, Sapp also became a spokesperson for domestic violence victims, and founded the foundations Safe Places for Abused Women and Children, and Give Back a Smile.

Activism
After her reign, Sapp starred as herself in the autobiographical television movie, Miss America: Behind the Crown, which depicted the physically abusive relationship between her and Faaola. In interviews about the movie, she stated, "When I learned that abuse hotlines were receiving up to 1,000 calls a day, I decided I should make the movie. If Miss America can have this happen to her and get out of it, it will help other people. Women can use my pain to help gain strength".

Sapp acted as spokesperson for, "Wal-Mart Versus Women" which promoted public awareness of the retail giant's nationwide pattern of discrimination against female employees. and was interviewed in Andrew Munger's 2007 documentary Wal*Mart Nation.

Sapp was inducted into Omicron Delta Kappa, the National Leadership Honor Society, in 2019 as an honoris causa initiate by Concordia University Irvine.

Personal life
Sapp married stuntman, Alex Daniels, on January 1, 2006. Together, the couple have three children, Kai O’Cain, Keira Makanalani, and Kale’a Charlie-Rose.

External links

Carolyn Suzanne Sapp 2004 interview in the Honolulu Star-Bulletin
Miss America page

References

1967 births
Hawaii Pacific University alumni
Living people
Miss America 1992 delegates
Miss America Preliminary Swimsuit winners
Miss America winners
People from Hawaii
20th-century American people